Vladan Danilović (born 27 July 1999) is a Bosnian professional footballer who plays as a defensive midfielder for Liga Portugal 2 club Nacional and the Bosnia and Herzegovina national team.

Danilović started his professional career at Sutjeska Foča, before joining Borac Banja Luka in 2016. Four years later, he moved to Nacional.

A former youth international for Bosnia and Herzegovina, Danilović made his senior international debut in 2020.

Club career

Early career
Danilović came through youth setup of his hometown club Sutjeska Foča. He made his professional debut against Drina Višegrad on 22 August 2015 at the age of 16.

In June 2016, he joined Borac Banja Luka. On 11 March 2017, he scored his first professional goal against Tekstilac, which secured the victory for his team.

In October 2020, he signed with Portuguese side Nacional.

International career
Danilović represented Bosnia and Herzegovina at various youth levels.

In August 2020, he received his first senior call-up, for 2020–21 UEFA Nations League games against Italy and Poland, but had to wait until 15 November to make his debut against Netherlands.

Career statistics

Club

International

Honours
Borac Banja Luka
First League of RS: 2016–17, 2018–19

References

External links

1999 births
Living people
People from Foča
Serbs of Bosnia and Herzegovina
Bosnia and Herzegovina footballers
Bosnia and Herzegovina youth international footballers
Bosnia and Herzegovina under-21 international footballers
Bosnia and Herzegovina international footballers
Bosnia and Herzegovina expatriate footballers
Association football midfielders
FK Sutjeska Foča players
FK Borac Banja Luka players
C.D. Nacional players
First League of the Republika Srpska players
Premier League of Bosnia and Herzegovina players
Primeira Liga players
Liga Portugal 2 players
Expatriate footballers in Portugal
Bosnia and Herzegovina expatriate sportspeople in Portugal